Malancha is a village in the Minakhan CD block in the Basirhat subdivision of the North 24 Parganas district in the state of West Bengal, India.

Geography

Location

Area overview
The area shown in the map is a part of the Ichhamati-Raimangal Plain, located in the lower Ganges Delta. It contains soil of mature black or brownish loam to recent alluvium. Numerous rivers, creeks and khals criss-cross the area. The tip of the Sundarbans National Park is visible in the lower part of the map (shown in green but not marked). The larger full screen map shows the full forest area. A large section of the area is a part of the Sundarbans settlements. The densely populated area is an overwhelmingly rural area. Only 12.96% of the population lives in the urban areas and 87.04% of the population lives in the rural areas.

Note: The map alongside presents some of the notable locations in the subdivision. All places marked in the map are linked in the larger full screen map.

Demographics
According to the 2011 Census of India, Malancha had a total population of 2,610, of which 1,399 (51%) were males and 1,271 (49%) were females. Population in the age range 0–6 years was 401. The total number of literate persons in Malancha was 1,607 (72.75% of the population over 6 years).

Transport
The originating/ starting point of State Highway 2 is at its junction with State Highway 3 at Malancha.

Tourist attraction
Malancha has attractions for tourists passing by: “This small town has one of the biggest Fish Markets in West Bengal. At Malancha you would see the mighty Icchamati River meeting the Bidyadhari River. You can also stop over the bridge over Bidyadhari River and enjoy the sunset. This side of the riverbank is dotted with brick kilns and their towering chimneys line up the riverbank for miles – it’s an amazing sight.”

Fish market
Malancha has one of the largest fish markets in south Bengal, where about 15,000 kg of fish is auctioned every day. There are at least 15 such wholesale fish markets in south Bengal, all supplying fish to Kolkata.

References

Villages in North 24 Parganas district